Petrus "Pé" Verhaegen (20 February 1902, Tremelo — 5 April 1958, Leuven) was a Belgian professional road bicycle racer.

Major results

1925
 national cyclo-cross championship
1926
Ronde van Vlaanderen for amateurs
1927
Tour de France:
Winner stages 10 and 17
7th place overall classification
1928
Tour de France:
Winner stage 4
16th place overall classification
1929
Paris–Brussels
1932
Zottegem
1933
Ronde van Haspengouw
1934
Vaals

External links 

Belgian male cyclists
1902 births
1958 deaths
Belgian Tour de France stage winners
Cyclists from Flemish Brabant
People from Tremelo
Belgian cyclo-cross champions